Karen Cox may refer to:
 Karen Cox (nurse), British nurse and academic
 Karen L. Cox, American historian and professor